Chak 358JB Dulham Shareef is a village located in Gojra tehsil, Toba Tek Singh District within Punjab province of Pakistan.

Populated places in Toba Tek Singh District